Acrocercops macrochalca is a moth of the family Gracillariidae. It is known from Mauritius.

This species has a wingspan of 10mm, the head, thorax & palpi are white, abdomen light ochreous-grey. The forewings are very narrowly elongated, golden-orange fulvous with three snow-white spots. Hindwings are pale fuscous

References

macrochalca
Moths of Africa
Moths described in 1910
Moths of Mauritius
Endemic fauna of Mauritius